Karl-Johan Anton Johnsson (born 28 January 1990) is a Swedish professional footballer who plays as a goalkeeper for Copenhagen and the Sweden national team.

Starting off his career in Sweden with Halmstads BK, Johnsson has gone on to represent NEC, Randers FC, and Guingamp before signing with Copenhagen in 2019. A full international for the Sweden national team since 2012, he was a squad player for his country at the 2018 FIFA World Cup as well as UEFA Euro 2020.

Career

Halmstads BK
In 2005, at the age of 15, Johnsson moved to Halmstads BK after beginning his career at Ränneslövs GIF. When goalkeeper Marcus Sahlman was loaned to Trelleborgs FF Johnsson was picked up as third choice goalkeeper on the senior team and he made his game debut on 24 August 2008 against Djurgårdens IF when Magnus Bahne was forced to leave the field during halftime. On 20 November 2008, it was reported that Johansson would go to Manchester, England, for a week and join Manchester City during training. As Conny Johansson retired and Marcus Sahlman left for Tromsø IL, Karl-Johan was made second choice goalkeeper for the 2009 season.

During the 2010 season Johnsson became second choice behind Robin Malmqvist. The 2011 season became turbulent, at first Halmstads BK appointed Josep Clotet Ruiz as new manager of the club, this saw changes among the goalkeepers as Malmqvist was loaned out to Tromsø IL in Norway and Spanish keeper Nauzet Pérez was brought in as first choice, however poor performance and problems with adapting to the Swedish lifestyle saw Pérez depart the club before half the season was played, with his departure Johnsson was appointed first choice as goalkeeper at the club.

NEC Nijmegen
On 5 November 2012, Halmstads BK announced that Johnsson would leave the club as a Bosman for Dutch club NEC when the transfer window opened on 1 January 2013.

Randers FC
On 11 July 2014, Johnsson signed for the Danish Superliga team Randers FC on a 3-year-contract.

Guingamp
On 28 June 2016, Johnsson signed with the French Ligue 1 team Guingamp. In the 2018–19 Coupe de la Ligue quarter-finals, Johnsson played the full 90 minutes as Guingamp eliminated PSG and thereby ended their 43 games-long unbeaten streak. He was an unused substitute in the 2019 Coupe de la Ligue final.

FC Copenhagen
On 12 July 2019, F.C. Copenhagen confirmed, that they had signed Johnsson on a four-year contract. On 10 August 2020, Johnsson made 13 saves in a 0–1 loss to Manchester United in the 2019–20 UEFA Europa League quarter-finals – the most saves in a Europa League game by a goalkeeper since 2009.

International career
Johnsson represented Sweden at U19 level before moving up to the Swedish U21 team and debuting against the Slovakian U21 team in 2009. Over time Johnsson was able to work himself into becoming the first choice goalkeeper in the U21 team.

Despite Halmstads BK's poor performance in the 2011 Allsvenskan with ended with Halmstad being relegated, Johnsson was called up to the Swedish national team for the 2012 January tour against Qatar and Bahrain. Missing out on the game against Bahrain, he then came on as a substitute at halftime against Qatar, making his senior team debut.

In May 2018 he was named in Sweden's 23-man squad for the 2018 FIFA World Cup in Russia. He was also included in Sweden's 26-man squad for UEFA Euro 2020.

Career statistics

Club

International

Honours
Copenhagen
 Danish Superliga: 2021–22

Individual
 Tipsbladet Det Gyldne Bur: 2015
UEFA Europa League Squad of the Season: 2019–20

References

External links
Voetbal International profile 

1990 births
Living people
Association football goalkeepers
Swedish footballers
Sweden international footballers
Sweden youth international footballers
Sweden under-21 international footballers
Halmstads BK players
NEC Nijmegen players
Randers FC players
En Avant Guingamp players
F.C. Copenhagen players
Allsvenskan players
Eredivisie players
Danish Superliga players
Ligue 1 players
2018 FIFA World Cup players
UEFA Euro 2020 players
Swedish expatriate footballers
Expatriate footballers in the Netherlands
Expatriate men's footballers in Denmark
Expatriate footballers in France
Swedish expatriate sportspeople in the Netherlands
Swedish expatriate sportspeople in Denmark
Swedish expatriate sportspeople in France